Killing With Kindness: Haiti, International Aid, and NGOs is a 2012 Rutgers University Press book written by Mark Schuller, assistant professor of anthropology and NGO Leadership Development at Northern Illinois University and affiliate at the Faculté d’Ethnologie, University of Haiti.

Awards
Schuller is the 2015 American Anthropological Association/Society for Applied Anthropology Margaret Mead Award.

References 

Rutgers University Press books